The Garra people (sometimes spelled Gara) are a community found in the Indian state of Jammu and Kashmir.

Social status
, the Garra people were classified as a Scheduled Tribe under the Indian government's reservation program of positive discrimination. As of 2011 Population Census of India, Garra population stands at 504, out of which 275 are males and 229 are females.

See also 
Beda people

References

Further reading 

Ladakh: The Individuality vs State, Harish K. Thakur, New Delhi: Manas Publications, 2014.

Scheduled Tribes of Jammu and Kashmir
Social groups of Jammu and Kashmir